Kidyo also known as Kulkuls are a sweet food, part of the goodies, Kuswar prepared for the Christmas festival celebrated in Goa and Mangalore, as well as the East Indian Community of Maharashtra.

Kulkul is made from maida flour, milk and sometimes eggs, and shaped into the form of small shells and fried in ghee or oil.

External links

Recipe of Kidyo
Goan Recipe of Kulkuls

Christmas food
Goan cuisine
Mangalorean cuisine